Mehama (Bactrian: Meyam, Brahmi:  Me-ha-ma), ruled c.461-493, was a king of Alchon Huns dynasty. He is little known, but the Talagan copper scroll mentions him as an active ruler making a donation to a Buddhist stupa in 492/93.  At that time, it is considered that the Alchon Huns were firmly in charge of the Buddhist region around Taxila, but had not yet started to conquer the Indian mainland.

Mehama is named Maha Shahi Mehama (Great Lord Mehama) in the Talagan copper scroll.

Mehama appears in a letter in the Bactrian language he wrote in 461-462 CE. The letter comes from the archives of the Kingdom of Rob, located in southern Bactria. In this letter he presents himself as:

Kadag is Kadagstan, an area in southern Bactria, in the region of Baghlan. Significantly, he presents himself as a vassal of the Sasanian Empire king Peroz I. 

Mehama (r.461-493) allied with Sasanian king Peroz I (459-484) in his victory over the Kidarites in 466 CE, and may also have helped him take the throne against his brother Hormizd III. 

It is thought that Mehama, after being elevated to the position of Governor for Peroz, was later able to wrestle autonomy or even independence.

See also
Kidarites

References

Central Asia
Hephthalites
493 deaths